Ankaraobato is the name of several municipalities in Madagascar:

 Ankaraobato, Marovoay - a town in Boeny.
 Ankaraobato  - a town in Analamanga
 a locality in Atsimo-Andrefana